The 2019 Derby City Council election took place on 2 May 2019 to elect members of Derby City Council in England. This was on the same day as other local elections.  The council remained under no overall control, with the Conservative Party overtaking the Labour Party as the largest party after gains in Chaddesden and Derwent. The Labour Party lost many of its leading councillors, including deputy leader Martin Rawson, former cabinet member Asaf Afzal and former Group and Council leader Paul Bayliss.

Election results

All comparisons in vote share are to the corresponding 2015 election.

Ward results

Abbey

Allestree

Alvaston

Arboretum

Blagreaves

Boulton

Chaddesden

Chellaston

Darley

Derwent

Littleover

Mackworth

Mickleover

Normanton

Oakwood

Sinfin

Spondon

References

`

2019 English local elections
2019
2010s in Derby
May 2019 events in the United Kingdom